The 2021 EuroLeague Final Four was the concluding EuroLeague Final Four tournament of the 2020–21 EuroLeague season, the 64th season of Europe's premier club basketball tournament, and the 21st season since it was first organised by Euroleague Basketball. It was the 34th Final Four of the modern EuroLeague Final Four era (1988–present), and the 36th time overall that the competition has concluded with a final four format. The Final Four was played at the Lanxess Arena in Cologne, Germany, on 28–30 May 2021.

Bracket

Semifinals

Semifinal A

Semifinal B

Third place game

Championship game

References

External links
Official website

Final
EuroLeague Finals
International basketball competitions hosted by Germany
Sports competitions in Cologne
2020s in Cologne
EuroLeague
EuroLeague Final Four